Satya Chandra Besra (7 April 1923 – 1982) was an Indian politician. He was a Member of Parliament, representing Dumka in the Lok Sabha the lower house of India's Parliament as a member of the Indian National Congress. Besra died in 1982.

References

External links
Official biographical sketch on the Parliament of India website

1923 births
1982 deaths
Lok Sabha members from Bihar
Indian National Congress politicians
India MPs 1962–1967
India MPs 1967–1970
India MPs 1971–1977